Ross Allen (born 21 June 1996) is an Irish cricketer. He made his List A debut for North West Warriors in the 2017 Inter-Provincial Cup on 29 May 2017. He made his first-class debut for North West Warriors in the 2017 Inter-Provincial Championship on 30 May 2017. He made his Twenty20 debut for North West Warriors in the 2017 Inter-Provincial Trophy on 23 June 2017.

In June 2019, he was named in the Ireland Wolves squad for their home series against the Scotland A cricket team.

References

External links
 

1996 births
Living people
Irish cricketers
North West Warriors cricketers
Place of birth missing (living people)